Geraldine McQueen may refer to:

 Geraldine McQueen (character), a fictional singer-songwriter from Britain's Got the Pop Factor...
 Geraldine McQueen (athlete), Grenadian middle-distance runner